The North Macedonia women's national handball team is the women's national handball team of North Macedonia. It is governed by the Macedonian Handball Federation and takes part in international team handball competitions.

History
First Women's Handball teams in Macedonia emerged in the second half of the 1940s. Soon Macedonian Handball federation started to organize national championships in big handball -11 players on a soccer field size. By the '60s it was transformed into small handball or indoor handball. Macedonian champions were qualified for federal Yugoslav Championship instead of European cup competitions. The best Macedonian players played for the Federal team of Yugoslavia. In the time of the federation 6 of the constitutional republics were sending one federal team to compete at the Olympics and World cup. Macedonia was participating within the federal team from 1950 till 1991. After the split of the federation, as a single republic from 1992 till 1994 Macedonia didn't manage to enter the qualifications for EC, WC and OG. From 1995 Macedonia participates as a single Republic to all qualifications and Championship tournaments.
At the 1992 Olympics Yugoslavia team was banned to participate. At the World cup 1993 only teams from the Olympics qualified so the Macedonian team did not have a chance to qualify. For the first European Championship 1994 team Macedonia didn't enter the qualifications. For the World Cup 1995 only teams from EURO 1994 qualified so again team Macedonian didn't get a chance to participate. Since EURO 1996 team Macedonia is regular in the qualifications. It entered 5 European Championships first one in 1998 then in 2000, 2006, 2008 and 2012. Most successful was the 2008 when they finished 7th as a host. The Macedonia team qualified for the Euro 2022 as a host nation again. For the  World Cup's they entered five times (1997, 1999, 2001, 2005 and 2007). The most successful was in 1997 when they've finished 7th. For the Olympic tournament, they had the best chance in 1999 World Cup when first they lost the 1/4 final game. Then after in the classification games for the 5 th place – last spot that qualifies for the Olympics finished 8th and did not qualify.

Home ground
The BTSC - Boris Trajkovski Sports Center (Sportski centar Boris Trajkovski) in Skopje is a multi-functional indoor sports arena. It is located in the Karpoš Municipality of Skopje, Macedonia. It is named after the former president, Boris Trajkovski. Its capacity is 10,000. There is an Olympic size Swimming Pool and 5 Star Hotel Alexander Palace within the complex. Additional Water Land Fun Park and Ice Skating Rink next to it. 

The arena is a home-ground of the  Macedonian handball team (men and women). The venue also contains four restaurants and a sports bar. It was one of two venues for the 2008 European Women's Handball Championship.It was a Venue again for the 2022 European Women's Handball Championship

Results
During the period 1957 till 1991 Macedonia was within the Federation of SFRJ. It was represented internationally within the team Yugoslavia as part of the Federation of 6 Republics. Macedonia is not a successor of the results of team Yugoslavia it was just part of it. During that time was present at the 3 Olympics and 10 World cup tournaments within the successful team Yugoslavia. After the split Macedonian team started to compete representing the single independent Republic.

World Championship

European Championship

Summer Olympics

Performance in other tournaments 
 Carpathian Trophy 1993 –  3rd
 Carpathian Trophy 1999 –  3rd
 Carpathian Trophy 2000 – 4th
 Carpathian Trophy 2001 – 6th
 Carpathian Trophy 2006 –  3rd
 Carpathian Trophy 2010 – 4th
 Carpathian Trophy 2011 – 4th
 Carpathian Trophy 2017 – 4th

Mediterranean Games
 2013: 9th
 2018: 4th
 2022: 7th

Team

Current squad
Roster fot the 2022 European Women's Handball Championship.

Head coach: Ljubomir Savevski

Notable players
All-Star Team
Indira Kastratovic, 1999 World Women's Handball Championship
Larisa Ferzalieva, 2000 European Women's Handball Championship
Top scorer
Indira Kastratovic, 1997 World Women's Handball Championship
Others
Gordana Naceva
Marina Abramova
Biljana Naumovska
Valentina Radulovic
Klara Boeva
Dana Filipovska
Natalija Todorovska,  she scored 21 goals against Cameroon at the 2005 World Championship which is still a record in 2021
Mileva Velkova
Anzela Platon
Mirjana Cupic
Dragana Pecevska
Olga Bujanova
Julija Nikolić  
Mirjeta Bajramoska

See also
 North Macedonia men's national handball team
 Macedonian Handball Federation

References

External links

IHF provile

North Macedonia
National team
Handball women